Ivana Raca (born September 10, 1999) is a Serbian basketball player, now playing for Fenerbahçe of the KBSL in Turkey and plays for the senior national team of Serbia. It is 1.88m high (6'03 '') and plays in the position of wing and wing center. She graduated from Wake Forest University with a degree in psychology. He currently plays for Allianz Geas Sesto (Milan - Italy) A1 league. In 2021, Ivana was drafted in the WNBA as the 28th pick from Los Angeles - Sparks.

Ivana is one of the most talented and promising young players in Europe. She proved this at the last European Under-20 Basketball Championships in Shapron, Hungary, in 2018, where she was named a member of the All-Star Five, and was chosen by the audience as the best player (MVP) of the European Championship. championships. She won two silver medals with the national team of Serbia (junior national team under 18 and junior national team under 20).

College

In 2017 Raca joined to the Wake Forest University.

Wake Forest statistics
Source

Career
Born in Cyprus, Ivana started playing basketball in 2009 at the AEL club from Limassol (junior team). From 2010 to 2012, she played in the following clubs: AEL from Limassol (junior team) and Proteas da Noi AEL Limassol. As a very young woman, she played for the younger basketball team of Cyprus. She continued her playing career in the junior team of PAOK from Thessaloniki (AS PAOK Thesalonikis), where she played from 2012 to 2015. As a member of the junior team and senior team PAOKA (PAOK Thesalonikis - Greece A1), she played in the 2013-14 season. and 2014-15. She played for the Proteas Vulas team from Athens (Proteas Vulas) from 2015 to 2017. In the jersey of this team, she achieved incredible success in the quadruple-double - 22 points, 21 rebounds, 11 assists and 10 stolen balls, and brought the cup to her team in the (ESKANA) Cup of Greece. In Greece, she won all the national championships in the junior category. Twice she was in the Top - 5. Twice she participated in the school world championships in Limoges, France (2015) and Porec, Croatia (2017) as the team captain, where she won a silver medal and was in the top five of the championship. Since 2017, he has been playing for the Wake Forrest University basketball team at the University of North Carolina, USA. In 2017, she played in the jersey of the Serbian junior national team at the European Under-18 Basketball Championship (2017 FIBA U18 Women's European Championship - Division A). The following 2018, she won a silver medal (2018 FIBA U20 Women's European Championship) with the junior national team of Serbia (under 20) in Sopron, Hungary. Ivana plays for the senior national team of Serbia.  Raca was drafted by the Los Angeles Sparks in the third round of the 2021 WNBA draft. In June 2021 Raca signed to Italian Geas Basket.

Serbian representation 
She played for all the younger selections of the Serbian national team, and is currently in the senior team of the national team. With the national team under 18, she won a silver medal at the 2017 World Championships in Sopron, Hungary. (2017 FIBA U18 Women's European Championship - Division A). At the European Championship in Sopron for players under 20 with the national team of Serbia (2018 FIBA U20 Women's European Championship), they won the silver medal again, in 2018. Ivana hit one of the most important shots, perhaps the key one in winning a medal - a three-pointer in the overtime match against the Italian national team. In the game against Slovakia, in the eighth finals, she scored 36 points, four threes, no misses, had ten rebounds - index 43. At the championship she was named a member of the ideal five (All-Star Five), and by the audience was chosen as the best player (MVP) of the European Championship.

Achievements 
Cyprus Cadet Championship (2009, 2010 and 2012).

Best Young Player of the Cyprus League (2012).

Played for the Cypriot national team (U16).

She won the Cyprus School Championship (2012 and 2013).

He won the Greek Junior Championship with the team (2013, 2015, 2016 and 2017).

She won the Greek School Championship (2013, 2014, 2015, 2016 and 2017).

Played in the Greek U15 national team (U15) (2013).

With the national team of Greece - under 15 won the tournament in Kavala (2013).

With the national team of Greece - under 15 he won the tournament in Athens (2014 and 2015) where he was the top scorer of the tournament.

Named the best player (MVP) under 15 in the tournament (New Year Kapagerovf) (2014).

Named the top scorer under 15 in the tournament (New Year Kapagerovf) (2014).

They won a gold medal at the World School Basketball Championship. (2015)

She twice participated in the school world championships in Limoges, France (2015) and Poreč, Croatia (2017) as the team captain, where she won a silver medal and was in the top five of the championship.

Named the best young player in Greece (2016).

In the junior championship of Greece, she won a gold medal - the best scorer of the championship (2017). [5]

Selected as the best player (All-Bosmans Team) (2017) A1 - senior team. [6]

With the national team under 18, she won a silver medal at the 2017 World Championships in Shapron, Hungary. (2017 FIBA U18 European Women's Championship - Division A). [7]

She won a silver medal in 2018 at the European Championship in Sopron for players under 20 with the Serbian national team (2018 FIBA U20 Women's European Championship). [8] [8]

At the European Championships, she was named a member of the All-Star Five (2018). [9]

He was chosen by the audience as the best player (MVP) of the European Championship (2018).

She scored 1,000 points in her career and thus became the 28th player in the history of the Wake Forist club. [10]

ALL-ACC top 3, average number of points 17.2 per game, 11 games with over 20 points - Top 3, total 193 points for two points - Top 2. [11] [12]

The best result in the last 20 years at the ALL-ACC tournament, 27 points and 13 rebounds. ALL-ACC First Team Tournament, top scorer tournament with an average of 20.33 points per game. [13]

Best ACC Conference Team (2020-2021)

Best ACC Conference Conference Team (2020)

Best (Best Little Striker in the USA) Basketball Hall of Fame FINALIST Miller's Award

ALL - ACC academic team

She was among the four best players in history with performance: double-double, number of points and rebounds

NCAA (International Player of the Year Finalist) Finalist

Named the best Wake Forista sport in all sports (2021)

VNBA - Draft as 28 pick from Los Angeles Sparks (2021)

ACC - averaged 17 points and 9 rebounds per game in 2021 (top scorer and jumper)

Family 
Ivana comes from a basketball family.  Father Dragan Raca is a former Serbian basketball player and a famous basketball coach who built his career (in Cyprus, Greece and China).  He was the selector of the basketball national teams of Lebanon, Cyprus and Macedonia.  He achieves notable coaching achievements today in China, where he has been engaged since 2010.  Today, he heads the Beikong Fly Dragons basketball club, a member of the Chinese CBA League, as a coach, head coach and general supervisor.  For his long-term work in the field of basketball, he was promoted to Honorary Doctor of Science "Alpha BC University".

Branka Raca's mother is a former basketball player and coach who built her career in Serbia and Cyprus.  She was her first coach.  Ivana's sister, Tijana Raca (October 28, 1997), is also a well-known basketball player and member of the Cyprus national team who played for the Wyoming University team.

See also 
 List of Serbian WNBA players

References

External links
Wake Forest Demon Deacons bio

1999 births
Living people
Los Angeles Sparks draft picks
Serbian women's basketball players
People from Larnaca
Forwards (basketball)
Wake Forest Demon Deacons women's basketball players
Serbs of Bosnia and Herzegovina